SS Saint Paul was a trans-Atlantic ocean liner named for the capital of Minnesota.

Saint Paul was launched on 10 April 1895 by William Cramp & Sons, Philadelphia, as a steel passenger liner. The ship later was chartered for United States Navy service as an auxiliary cruiser from her owner, International Navigation Company, by a board appointed on 12 March 1898; and commissioned on 20 April 1898 for Spanish–American War service, Captain Charles D. Sigsbee in command.

Service history

Spanish–American War

Departing Philadelphia on 5 May 1898, Saint Pauls first assignment was to cruise in search of Admiral Cervera's squadron between Morant Point, Jamaica, and western Haiti. She captured the British collier Restormel—bound for Cuba with a critical cargo of Cardiff coal—on 25 May and sent her into Key West under a prize crew. She cruised off Santiago de Cuba and Guantanamo Bay into mid-June, then sailed to join the force blockading San Juan, Puerto Rico.

Saint Paul arrived off San Juan on the morning of 22 June. Shortly after midday, in the second battle of San Juan, the Spanish cruiser , emerged from the harbor and, remaining under protection of shore batteries, opened fire on Saint Paul at long range without success. Isabel II was joined shortly by the destroyer , which attempted to close Saint Paul to launch torpedoes. Saint Paul took Terror under heavy fire, scoring at least one direct hit which heavily damaged the destroyer. Terror gave up the attack and returned to port, followed by Isabel II.

Saint Paul spent the remainder of her Spanish–American War service as a transport, operating for 48 days in July–August as a War Department vessel. She landed troops at Siboney, Cuba, and Arroyo, Puerto Rico, subsequently returning soldiers from Guantanamo Bay to New York City through 15 August. Entering the Cramp shipyard on 22 August for re-conversion to mercantile service, Saint Paul was decommissioned on 2 September and returned to her owner the same day.

Collision
On 25 April 1908, outward bound from Southampton, England, in a late snowstorm, Saint Paul was involved in a collision with the British cruiser  in the Needles Channel. Gladiator foundered in shallow water with the loss of 27 crew, but Saint Paul was able to return to Southampton for repairs.

World War I

Saint Paul was again taken over for wartime service on 27 October 1917. Operated by the United States Shipping Board as a transport on the War Department account, she retained her merchant crew and carried a naval armed guard on board. She made twelve voyages between New York and Liverpool, England. She was transferred to the Navy account in April 1918; designated SP-1643; and overhauled at New York. Then, while being towed to her berth from dry dock on 28 April with her ballast removed, she capsized in the North River. Righted on 11 September, she was subsequently turned over to the Commandant, 3rd Naval District, on 17 October.

Saint Paul entered the New York Navy Yard the following day, but the end of World War I led to cancellation of plans to convert the ship to a troopship.

Post-war
Placed in temporary commission on 14 January 1919 for the purpose of fixing responsibility for her care outside the Navy Yard, Saint Paul soon began reconversion for mercantile service. Returned to her owner on 24 March 1919, Saint Paul was scrapped in Germany in 1923.

Postage stamp
As part of the celebrations surrounding the 1901 Pan-American Exposition a set of six commemorative postage stamps were issued. The highest value, 10 cents, shows Saint Paul under steam.  While the three lowest stamps in the series include rare inverted printings, no errors are known for this issue.

References

External links

 
 Video dedicated to the ocean liner SS St. Paul

Ships built by William Cramp & Sons
World War I cruisers of the United States
Auxiliary cruisers of the United States Navy
1895 ships
Spanish–American War cruisers of the United States
Maritime incidents in 1908